Gilbert Martineau (1918 – 23 August 1995, in La Rochelle) was a French naval officer, author of books on Napoleon and his family, honorary consul, and curator 1956-1987 of the French properties on St Helena, where Napoleon had been in exile .

History
An anglophile, he  was living in London when war broke out in 1939, and he joined the Free French in 1940. His wartime service included a period on a British submarine, and service in Mauritania.  On demobilization in 1945 he joined the French Naval Reserve, and was called back into the service in 1954-1955.  After the war he worked as Director of Publications for Nagel.

In 1956 he decided to take up an appointment on the remote British Island of St Helena as honorary consul and curator of the French properties, a position which he held until 1987. He continued to live at Longwood House for the rest of his life. As well as devoting himself to the restoration of the properties, he was also a prolific author.  He died in La Rochelle in 1995.

Works
Napoléon à Sainte-Hélène - Tallandier, Paris -  Prix Marie-Eugène Simon-Henri-Martin  bestowed by the Académie française
La Vie Quotidienne À Sainte-Hélène Au Temps De Napoléon - translated as Napoleon's St. Helena (John Murray, 1968) by Frances Partridge
Napoléon se Rend Aux Anglais - Hachette, Paris. Prix du Cercle de l'Union - translated as Napoleon Surrenders (John Murray, 1971) by Frances Partridge
Napoléon et l'Empire - ouvrage collectif, Hachette
 Sainte-Hélène - éditions Rencontre, Lausanne
Le Retour des Cendres - translated as  Napoleon's Last Journey (John Murray, 1976) by Frances Partridge
Madame Mere - éditions France-Empire, Paris - translated as Madame Mere: Napoleon’s Mother (John Murray, 1978) by Frances Partridge
Le Roi de Rome - édition France-Empire
 Marie-Louise, Impératrice des Français - édition France-Empire
L’Entente Cordiale - édition France-Empire
Pauline Bonaparte, Princesse Borghese - édition France-Empire
Lord Byron. La Malédiction Du Génie - Tallandier
Lucien Bonaparte, Prince De Canino - édition France-Empire
Caroline Bonaparte, Princesse Murat, Reine de Naples - édition France-Empire

Further reading 
Jean-Paul Kauffmann, The Dark Room at Longwood A Voyage to St Helena. London: The Harvill Press. 2000

External links 
 Gilbert Martineau on France Inter
 Gilbert Martineau on the site of the Académie française
 Gilbert MARTINEAU on the site of éditions Taillandier

20th-century French non-fiction writers
1918 births
1995 deaths
French expatriates in the United Kingdom